Ilari Mettälä (born 26 April 1994) is a Finnish former professional football forward.

References

1994 births
Living people
Finnish footballers
Turun Palloseura footballers
FC Ilves players
Veikkausliiga players
Ykkönen players
Kakkonen players
Association football forwards